Milo Merrit (January 3, 1915 – January 8, 2009) was an American politician who served in the Iowa Senate from the 7th district from 1975 to 1979.

He died on January 8, 2009, in Osage, Iowa at age 94.

References

1915 births
2009 deaths
Democratic Party Iowa state senators